Heavenly Bodies was a new wave/ethereal wave band from England, formed in 1986.

History 
The band comprised lead vocalist Caroline Seaman and didgeridoo player and saxophonist Tony Waerea of This Mortal Coil, and former Dead Can Dance members drummer James Pinker and bassist Scott Rodger.

In 1987, they released their first song on the Perdurabo compilation (Cathexis Recordings) and recorded their studio album Celestial, which was released in 1988, followed by an EP called Rains on Me in the same year. Rains on Me was remixed by Robin Guthrie of the Cocteau Twins.

Discography

Studio albums
 Celestial (1988)

EPs
 Rains on Me (1988)

References

External links 
 

English alternative rock groups
English gothic rock groups
Musical groups disestablished in 1988
Musical groups established in 1986
English new wave musical groups
Third Mind Records artists
Dream pop musical groups